Chupa is an urban locality (an urban-type settlement) in Loukhsky District of the Republic of Karelia, Russia, located on the coast of the White Sea,  north of Petrozavodsk, the capital of the republic. As of the 2010 Census, its population was 2,924.

History
It has been known since 1574. Urban-type settlement status was granted to it in 1943.

Administrative and municipal status
Within the framework of administrative divisions, the urban-type settlement of Chupa is subordinated to Loukhsky District. As a municipal division, Chupa, together with one rural locality (the station of Chupa), is incorporated within Loukhsky Municipal District as Chupinskoye Urban Settlement.

References

Notes

Sources

Urban-type settlements in the Republic of Karelia
Arkhangelsk Governorate
White Sea